Esteville is a commune in the Seine-Maritime department in the region of Normandy, France.

Geography

Heraldry

Population

Notable people
Abbé Pierre, priest and founder of the Emmaus movement, lived here for more than 20 years and was buried here, alongside 20 of his companions and his secretary, Lucie Coutaz who assisted him for much of his life.
A centre of the Emmaus Movement, housing youngsters in difficulty, was built here where the priest's own private room may still be seen. Today his grave has become a place of meditation and the village of Esteville sometimes receives between 300 and 500 visitors per day.

Places of interest
 The church of St.Sulpice, dating from the sixteenth century.
 The church of St.Clotilde, dating from the sixteenth century.
 The seventeenth-century chateau.

See also
Communes of the Seine-Maritime department

References

Communes of Seine-Maritime